The following highways are numbered 434:

Canada
Manitoba Provincial Road 434
Newfoundland and Labrador Route 434

Japan
 Japan National Route 434

United States
  Florida State Road 434
  Montana Secondary Highway 434
  New York State Route 434
 New York State Route 434 (former)
  Pennsylvania Route 434
  Puerto Rico Highway 434
 Texas:
  Texas State Highway Loop 434
  Farm to Market Road 434
  Wyoming Highway 434